A Mass of Life (German: Eine Messe des Lebens) is a cantata by English composer Frederick Delius, based on the German text of Friedrich Nietzsche's philosophical novel Thus Spoke Zarathustra (1883-1885). In 1898, Delius had written a male choir and orchestral setting of "Midnight Song" from the same work, and this was revised to form part of the Mass.

Eine Messe des Lebens is the largest of Delius's concert works, being written for four SATB soloists, double choir and orchestra. It was dedicated to Fritz Cassirer, who had had an important hand in choosing the passages from Nietzsche's text. Lionel Carley and others, writing in Grove Music Online, describe it as the composer's "grandest project" and say that "Delius responded to Nietzsche's rich poetry in some of his most virile and exultant music, as well as in passages of a profoundly hypnotic and static calm."

The work was completed in 1905. Part 2 was first performed in Munich in 1908, with a complete performance in London a year later.

In September 2022 the Bergen Philharmonic Orchestra and Choir performed the Norwegian premiere of the work, conducted by Mark Elder, and the Choir of the Earth rehearsed and recorded it remotely, to produce a combined performance in November 2022.

References

Further reading
 
  Discusses On Hearing the First Cuckoo in Spring and A Mass of Life

External links
 
 Text of lyrics with translation into English by William Wallace

Compositions by Frederick Delius
Masses (music)
Cantatas
1905 compositions
Adaptations of works by Friedrich Nietzsche
Thus Spoke Zarathustra